Cape Collinson Chinese Permanent Cemetery is a private, non-profit cemetery in Cape Collinson, Hong Kong. It is one of the largest cemeteries in Hong Kong. 

The term 'Permanent' refers to the cemetery site, not the graves. The cemetery is nevertheless like all other plots of land in the territory subject to a land lease. For this cemetery the lease expire in 2036.

History
Cape Collinson Chinese Permanent Cemetery was opened in 1963 by The Board of Management of the Chinese Permanent Cemeteries, a statutory body of Hong Kong established in 1913, that manages four Chinese permanent cemeteries in the territory. The cemetery was extended in 1973.

Notable burials 
 , educator, co-founder and principal of the Shue Yan College/Shue Yan University, former judge
 , almanacist 
 Lam Sheung Yee, international footballer, educator and football commentator
 , journalist, founder of Wah Kiu Yat Po

See also 
 Cape Collinson Crematorium
 Holy Cross Catholic Cemetery
 Sai Wan War Cemetery
 List of cemeteries in Hong Kong

References

Further reading

External links

  
 
 Film Services Office entry

Cemeteries in Hong Kong
Chai Wan